The 908th Expeditionary Air Refueling Squadron is a provisional United States Air Force (USAF) unit.  It is assigned to the 378th Expeditionary Operations Group as part of the 378th Air Expeditionary Wing at Prince Sultan Air Base in Saudi Arabia. It has supported combat operations in Afghanistan, Iraq, and Syria from its previous location of Al Dhafra Air Base in the United Arab Emirates. The squadron has a varied background, having been formed by a series of consolidations of no fewer than five distinct units.

The squadron is one of the oldest in the USAF. Its origins date to 16 June 1917, when the 18th Aero Squadron was organized at Rockwell Field, San Diego, California.  This unit served as a pilot training squadron during World War I until it was demobilized in 1919.  A second predecessor was also active under the same name at Rockwell for nine months in the early 1920s.

The third predecessor of the squadron was the 18th Headquarters Squadron, which served as the host Air Corps unit at Bolling Field, District of Columbia from 1922 until 1928.

The fourth predecessor of the squadron was the 18th Reconnaissance Squadron, which was activated at Langley Field, Virginia in 1936.  The squadron saw combat during World War II as the 408th Bombardment Squadron in the South West Pacific Theater of World War II, where it earned two Distinguished Unit Citations and a Philippine Republic Presidential Unit Citation.  Elements of the squadron also participated in the Battle of Midway.  It was inactivated in the Philippines in 1946.

The 408th Bombardment Squadron was again activated at March Air Force Base, California in 1958 as part of Strategic Air Command (SAC) during the expansion of Boeing B-47 Stratojet wings during the Cold War.  It was inactivated as the B-47 was being replaced by the longer-ranged Boeing B-52 Stratofortress.

The unit's fifth predecessor was also part of SAC as the 908th Air Refueling Squadron, stationed at Kincheloe Air Force Base, Michigan equipped with Boeing KC-135 Stratotankers.  It stood alert at Kincheloe and deployed aircrews and aircraft to support combat operations in Vietnam until it was inactivated when the Air Force closed the base.

The squadron was converted to provisional status in March 2002 as part of the War on Terror. It has served as a McDonnell Douglas KC-10 Extender squadron in Southwest Asia since then, with KC-135 aircraft added in late 2003 until an undetermined time.

History

World War I
The first predecessor of the squadron was established in the summer of 1917 as the Air Service 18th Aero Squadron, training aviation students during World War I at Rockwell Field in southern California. The squadron apparently operated Curtiss JN-4 and improved Curtiss JN-6 "Jenny" two-seat trainers and Thomas-Morse S-4 single-seat advanced trainers. In July 1918, it was redesignated as Squadron B, Rockwell Field. It was demobilized in late 1918 when the training squadrons at Rockwell were combined into a single flying school detachment.

Interwar period
The second predecessor of the squadron was established at Rockwell in 1921 as the 18th Squadron (Observation).  Its mission as an observation squadron was to fly aerial photographic missions and to act as an airborne observation post during maneuvers, but it is not certain that the squadron was manned or equipped.  It was inactivated nine months after its activation.

The third predecessor of the squadron was organized in 1922 as the Headquarters Detachment, Bolling Field, District of Columbia.  It replaced the 99th Squadron (Observation) as the Air Service host unit at Bolling responsible for station administration. In 1924 the detachment was expanded to a squadron and the following year, it was redesignated the 18th Headquarters Squadron and consolidated with the two previous 18th squadrons.  The squadron operated various aircraft at Bolling. It was inactivated in 1928 and was replaced as the Air Corps host by the Air Corps Detachment, Bolling Field.

The fourth predecessor of the squadron was established in 1935 as the 18th Observation Squadron and activated in 1936 at Mitchel Field on Long Island, New York.  It was assigned to the 2d Wing of General Headquarters Air Force and equipped with Martin B-10 bombers. The squadron flew reconnaissance and coastal patrol flights over Long Island Sound and southern New England.  The squadron received Douglas B-18 Bolos in 1937 along with a mixture of obsolete attack and light observation aircraft in the build-up before World War II The unit received early model Martin B-26 Marauders while retaining its B-18s.

World War II

After the Pearl Harbor Attack, the squadron was transferred to the West Coast, flying antisubmarine patrols from Muroc Army Air Field, California from December 1941 to the end of January 1942. It was then assigned to Fifth Air Force. By the time the squadron arrived in the Southwest Pacific Theater the situation on the Philippines was desperate, and the squadron was based in Australia, where it was redesignated as the 408th Bombardment Squadron.

While the squadron was stationed at Reid River Airfield, Australia, two of the squadron's aircraft were diverted from their flight to Australia and flew missions during the Battle of Midway between 29 May 1942 and 4 June 1942. These aircraft operated under the control of the Navy, whose Patrol Wing Two controlled both Army and Navy aircraft operating from Midway.  They were armed with torpedoes and on 4 June, along with two B-26s of the 69th Bombardment Squadron of VII Bomber Command, attacked the enemy fleet.  They met with heavy antiaircraft fire and opposition from enemy fighters.  Two of the Marauders were shot down.  Although the other two made successful attacks, both aircraft crash landed upon their return to Midway. From Australia, the 408th also attacked Japanese targets on Papua New Guinea and New Britain.  Its actions in New Guinea earned the squadron two Distinguished Unit Citations. In October 1943 the B-26 Marauders were joined by North American B-25 Mitchells, and for the rest of the year the group continued to operate in support of Allied troops on New Guinea.

While stationed at Nadzab Airfield in February 1944 the unit converted to Consolidated B-24 Liberators optimized for long range bombing missions. While transitioning, the squadron was attached to the 309th Bombardment Wing for operational control. With the new bombers came a designation as a heavy bomber unit.  The squadron's Liberators attacked targets on Borneo, Ceram and Halmahera, among them the crucial oil fields of the Dutch East Indies.  In September 1944 the squadron moved its attention to the Philippines, attacking targets on Leyte. It moved to Leyte on 15 November 1944. From then until August 1945 it flew against targets on Luzon, as well as supporting the campaign on Borneo and even ranging as far as China. Its actions in the Philippines won it a Philippine Presidential Unit Citation. Finally, in August 1945 the unit moved to Okinawa, from where it flew a number of armed reconnaissance missions over southern Japan.  The squadron moved on paper to the Philippines in November, leaving its personnel and equipment behind on Okinawa.  It was inactivated at Fort William McKinley in early 1946.

Cold War

The 408th was activated at March Air Force Base, California in 1958 when Strategic Air Command (SAC) expanded its wings flying Boeing B-47 Stratojets from three to four squadrons.  In March 1961, President John F. Kennedy directed that the phaseout of the B-47 be accelerated. and the squadron was inactivated on 1 January 1962 as part of the drawdown of the USAF B-47 force.  Two years later, the squadron was combined with the preceding units, but remained inactive.

The 908th Air Refueling Squadron was activated on 1 July 1963 by SAC at Kincheloe Air Force Base, Michigan and equipped with Boeing KC-135 Stratotankers. Its mission was to provide air refueling to the Boeing B-52 Stratofortress strategic bombers of its parent 449th Bombardment Wing and other USAF units as directed.  This included taskings to provide air refueling for McDonnell F-4 Phantom II fighters and Douglas RB-66 Destroyer reconnaissance aircraft deploying to Southeast Asia.

The unit deployed individual aircraft and crews to the Western Pacific region between 1966 and 1975 to support combat operations of deployed SAC units and tactical aircraft over Southeast Asia during the Vietnam War, including participation in Operation Young Tiger. The squadron also deployed crews and aircraft to support the Torrejon, Eielson and Hickam Tanker Task Forces.

In 1976 the squadron contributed to its parent 449th Bombardment Wing being awarded the Omaha Trophy as the best wing in SAC. It was inactivated on 30 September 1977 when Kincheloe closed.

In September 1985, the 908th was consolidated with the 408th, but for the time, it remained inactive.

Expeditionary operations
The squadron was reactivated as the 908th Expeditionary Air Refueling Squadron, a provisional squadron, in July 2002 as a part of the Global War on Terror and equipped with McDonnell Douglas KC-10 Extenders. Boeing KC-135 Stratotankers were added in late 2003 until an undetermined time. The squadron has been active as part of Operation Iraqi Freedom and Operation Enduring Freedom conducting combat air refueling.  The squadron's KC-10s can refuel aircraft with either a boom or with a drogue, which makes it capable of refueling Air Force or Navy aircraft, as well as aircraft from other coalition air forces. In 2010 the squadron flew the first combat mission with an all-female KC-10 crew. While refueling strike aircraft in Afghanistan and Iraq, during 2011, the squadron supported an average of more than four "Troops in Contact" events daily and provided about a third of the airborne fuel used to protect ground forces. As of 2017 it was supporting the Military intervention against ISIL in Iraq and Syria.

Lineage
 18th Aero Squadron'
 Organized as the 18th Aero Squadron on 20 August 1917
 Redesignated 18th Aero Squadron (Training) c. 30 September 1917
 Redesignated Squadron B, Rockwell Field on 23 July 1918
 Demobilized on 23 November 1918
 Reconstituted on 17 March 1925 and consolidated with the 18th Observation Squadron and Headquarters Squadron, Bolling Field as the 18th Headquarters Squadron

18th Observation Squadron
 Authorized as the 18th Squadron (Observation) on 30 August 1921
 Organized on 1 October 1921
 Inactivated on 23 July 1922
 Redesignated 18th Observation Squadron on 25 January 1923 (remained inactive)
 Disbanded on 18 February 1925
 Reconstituted on 17 March 1925 and consolidated with Squadron B, Rockwell Field and Headquarters Squadron, Bolling Field as the 18th Headquarters Squadron

18th Headquarters Squadron
 Organized as Headquarters Detachment, Bolling Field on 11 July 1922
 Redesignated Headquarters Squadron, Bolling Field on 6 October 1924
 Consolidated on 17 March 1925 with Squadron B, Rockwell Field and the 18th Observation Squadron and redesignated 18th Headquarters Squadron
 Inactivated on 31 March 1928
 Disbanded on 1 October 1933
 Reconstituted and consolidated in 1964 with 408th Bombardment Squadron as the 408th Bombardment Squadron

408th Bombardment Squadron
 Constituted as the 18th Observation Squadron (Long Range, Light Bombardment) on 1 March 1935
 Redesignated 18th Reconnaissance Squadron and activated on 1 September 1936
 Redesignated 18th Reconnaissance Squadron (Medium Range) on 6 December 1939
 Redesignated 18th Reconnaissance Squadron (Medium) on 20 November 1940
 Redesignated 408th Bombardment Squadron (Medium) on 22 April 1942
 Redesignated 408th Bombardment Squadron, Heavy on 3 February 1944
 Inactivated on 29 April 1946
 Redesignated 408th Bombardment Squadron, Medium on 6 October 1958
 Activated on 1 January 1959
 Discontinued and inactivated on 1 January 1962
 Consolidated in 1964 with the 18th Headquarters Squadron
 Consolidated on 19 September 1985 with the 908th Air Refueling Squadron as the 908th Air Refueling Squadron

908th Expeditionary Air Refueling Squadron
 Constituted as the 908th Air Refueling Squadron, Heavy on 20 March 1963 and activated (not organized)
 Organized on 1 July 1963
 Inactivated 30 September 1977
 Consolidated on 19 September 1985 with the 408th Bombardment Squadron (remained inactive)
 Redesignated 908th Expeditionary Air Refueling Squadron and converted to provisional status on 27 March 2002 
 Activated 6 July 2002

Assignments
 Air Service, Western Department, 20 August 1917
 Unknown, 23 July 2018 – 23 November 1918
 Ninth Corps Area, 1 October 1921 – 23 July 1922
 District of Washington, 11 July 1922
 Third Corps Area, October 1927 – 31 March 1928
 2d Wing, 1 September 1936 (attached to 9th Bombardment Group until 1 February 1940, then to 22d Bombardment Group)
 22d Bombardment Group, 24 April 1942 – 29 April 1946
 22d Bombardment Wing, 1 January 1959 – 1 January 1962
 449th Bombardment Wing, 1 July 1963 – 30 September 1977
 Air Combat Command to assign as needed, 27 March 2002
 380th Expeditionary Operations Group, 6 July 2002 – March 2022
 378th Expeditionary Operations Group, March 2022 - present378th Air Expeditionary Wing

Stations

 Rockwell Field, California, 20 August 1917 – 23 November 1918
 Rockwell Field, California, 1 October 1921 – 23 July 1922
 Bolling Field, District of Columbia, 11 July 1922 – 31 March 1928
 Mitchel Field, New York, 1 September 1936
 Langley Field, Virginia, 15 November 1940
 Muroc Army Air Field, California, 9 December 1941 – 29 January 1942
 Archerfield Airport (Brisbane), Australia, 25 February 1942
 RAAF Base Townsville, Australia, 7 April 1942
 Reid River Airfield, Australia, 12 April 1942
 Dobodura Airfield, New Guinea, 15 October 1943

 Nadzab Airfield, New Guinea, 22 December 1943
 Owi Airfield, Schouten Islands, Netherlands East Indies, 26 July 1944
 Dulag, Leyte, Philippines, c. 9 November 1944
 Angaur Airfield, Palau, c. 1 December 1944
 Guiuan Airfield, Samar, Philippines, 14 January 1945
 Clark Field, Luzon, Philippines, 13 March 1945
 Motobu Airfield, Okinawa, c. 21 August 1945
 Fort William McKinley, Luzon, Philippines, 23 November 1945 – 29 April 1946
 March Air Force Base, California, 1 January 1959 – 1 January 1962
 Kincheloe Air Force Base, Michigan, 1 July 1963 – 30 September 1977
 Al Dhafra Air Base, United Arab Emirates, 2002 – March 2022
 Prince Sultan Air Base, Saudi Arabia, March 2022 -

Aircraft

 Curtiss JN-4, 1917–1918
 Curtiss JN-6, 1917–1918
 Thomas-Morse S-4, 1917–1918
 Unknown, 1921–1922
 DeHavilland DH-4 during the period 1922–1928
 Ryan M-1 during the period 1922–1928
 Douglas O-2 during the period 1922–1928
 Boeing PW-9 during the period 1922–1928

 Curtiss P-1 Hawk during the period 1922–1928
 Curtiss 0-1 Falcon evidently during the period 1922–1928
 Martin B-10, 1936–1937
 Douglas B-18 Bolo, 1937–1941
 Northrop A-17, during period 1936–1940
 Fairchild C-8, during period 1936–1940
 Douglas OA-4 Dolphin, during period 1936–1940

 Sikorsky OA-8, during period 1936–1940
 North American B-25 Mitchell, 1941
 Martin B-26 Marauder, 1941–1943
 Consolidated B-24 Liberator, 1944–1945
 Boeing B-47 Stratojet, 1959–1961
 Boeing KC-135 Stratotanker, 1963–1977
 McDonnell Douglas KC-10 Extender, 2002–present
 Boeing KC-135 Stratotanker, 2003–undetermined

Awards and campaigns

See also
 List of United States Air Force air refueling squadrons
 List of American Aero Squadrons
 List of Martin B-26 Marauder operators
 United States Army Air Forces in Australia
 List of B-47 units of the United States Air Force

References

Notes
Explanatory Notes

Footnotes

Bibliography

 
 
 
 *

Further reading

 
 
 
  (Markings of unit B-24, B-25 and B-26 aircraft during World War II)

External links
 

Air refueling squadrons of the United States Air Force